Asciodini is a tribe of the species-rich subfamily Spilomelinae in the pyraloid moth family Crambidae. The tribe was erected by Richard Mally, James E. Hayden, Christoph Neinhuis, Bjarte H. Jordal and Matthias Nuss in 2019.

Asciodini currently comprises 79 species in the following 13 genera:
Arthromastix Warren, 1890
Asciodes Guenée, 1854
Beebea Schaus, 1923
Bicilia Amsel, 1956
Ceratocilia Amsel, 1956
Ceratoclasis Lederer, 1863 (= Ceratoclassis Hulst, 1886)
Erilusa Walker, 1866
Laniifera Hampson, 1899
Laniipriva Munroe, 1976
Loxomorpha Amsel, 1956 (= Chrysobotys Munroe, 1956)
Maracayia Amsel, 1956
Psara Snellen, 1875 (= Epichronistis Meyrick, 1886)
Sathria Lederer, 1863

References

Spilomelinae
Moth tribes